Wolves is a 2016 American sports drama film written and directed by Bart Freundlich and starring Michael Shannon, Carla Gugino, Taylor John Smith, Chris Bauer and John Douglas Thompson. The film was released on March 3, 2017, by IFC Films.

Plot
Anthony is a standout player on his Manhattan high school's basketball team with seemingly everything going for him: a killer three-point shot, a loving girlfriend, and a chance at a scholarship to Cornell. But Anthony's dreams of playing college ball are jeopardized by his volatile father, a hard-drinking writer whose compulsive gambling threatens to derail the lives of both his wife and son.

Cast
 Michael Shannon as Lee Keller
 Carla Gugino as Jenny Keller
 Taylor John Smith as Anthony Keller 
 Chris Bauer as Charlie 
 John Douglas Thompson as Socrates 
 Zazie Beetz as Victoria 
 Jessica Rothe as Lola
 Wayne Duvall as Coach Ray 
 Danny Hoch as Sean
 Noah Le Gros as Oliver
 Christopher Meyer as Hakim
 Richard Kohnke as Billy Dunn
 Harry Thomas as Finals Referee

Production
Principal photography began in June 2015.

Release
The film premiered at the Tribeca Film Festival on April 15, 2016. The film was released on March 3, 2017, by IFC Films.

Reception

Critical response
On review aggregator website Rotten Tomatoes, the film holds an approval rating of 36% based on 25 reviews, and an average rating of 4.8/10. On Metacritic, the film has a weighted average score of 46 out of 100, based on 13 critics, indicating "mixed or average reviews".

References

External links
 
 
 

2016 films
2010s sports drama films
American sports drama films
Films directed by Bart Freundlich
2016 drama films
Films about gambling
2016 independent films
2010s English-language films
2010s American films